The Kremlin pool, also President's pool is a group of Russian journalists accredited to regularly cover the activities of the President of Russia and the top Russian government.

Yelena Tregubova in her book The tales of a Kremlin digger spoke about the behind-the-scenes activities of the Kremlin pool of Boris Yeltsin and the early years of Vladimir Putin, attracting an angry reaction from the Kremlin.

Notable journalists 
 Andrey Kolesnikov (since 2001)
 Boris Grishchenko (late 1970s - 2004)
 Yelena Tregubova (1997-2001)
 Margarita Simonyan (2002-2005)
 Natalya Melikova (since 2002)
 Dmitry Glukhovsky (mid 2000s)

See also 
 White House press corps

References 

Russian journalism organizations